Vlas Shichkin (born 25 January 2002) is a Russian road and track cyclist.

Major results

Track

2019
 UCI World Junior Championships
1st  Points race
3rd  Team pursuit
 UEC European Junior Championships
1st  Points race
1st  Madison (with Ilia Schegolkov)
2nd  Team pursuit
2021
 UEC European Under-23 Championships
1st  Points race
1st  Team pursuit
2nd  Madison (with Ilia Shchegolkov)
 National Championships
1st  Madison (with Gleb Syritsa)
1st  Points race
 3rd  Points race, UEC European Championships

Road
2017
 2nd  Road race, European Youth Summer Olympic Festival
2019
 2nd Gran Premio Eccellenze Valli del Soligo
2020
 1st Overall Manavgat Side Junior
1st Stage 1 (ITT)
 5th Overall Velo Alanya Junior

References

External links

2002 births
Living people
Russian male cyclists
Russian track cyclists